Box Recreation Area is a 320-acre area that is popular for rock climbing and bouldering due to its rugged terrain. It is located near Socorro, New Mexico and consists of a box canyon with five cliffs on each side. Only those who are proficient at rock climbing are advised to attempt the challenges posed by this area. It is under the supervision of the Bureau of Land Management.

Located about an hour's drive from Albuquerque, Box Canyon is composed of rhyolite rock, smooth in some places but also sharp with pockets in others.

References

External links
Gila Lower Box Canyon

Canyons and gorges of New Mexico
Bureau of Land Management areas in New Mexico
Climbing areas of New Mexico
Landforms of Socorro County, New Mexico
Protected areas of Socorro County, New Mexico